This page shows the results of the Cycling Competition at the 1963 Pan American Games, held from April 20 to May 5, 1963 in São Paulo, Brazil. There were a total number of five medal events, with only men competing.

Men's competition

Men's 1.000m Match Sprint (Track)

Men's 1.000m Time Trial (Track)

Men's 4.000m Team Pursuit (Track)

Men's Individual Race (Road)

Men's Team Race (Road)

References
Results

1963
Events at the 1963 Pan American Games
Pan American Games
Pan American Games
Pan American Games
1963 Pan American Games